Christoph Scharer (born ) is a Swiss male artistic gymnast, representing his nation at international competitions.  He participated at the 2004 Summer Olympics and 2008 Summer Olympics He also competed at world championships, including the 2001 World Artistic Gymnastics Championships and 2005 World Artistic Gymnastics Championships.

References

1980 births
Living people
Swiss male artistic gymnasts
Place of birth missing (living people)
Gymnasts at the 2004 Summer Olympics
Gymnasts at the 2008 Summer Olympics
Olympic gymnasts of Switzerland
21st-century Swiss people